Macià Alavedra i Moner (26 March 1934 – 29 September 2018) was a Spanish politician from Convergence and Union. He served as a member of the constituent, first and third legislatures of the Congress of Deputies, representing Barcelona Province.

In October 2009 he was arrested on suspicion of involvement in corruption.

He died of leukemia in 2018.

References

1934 births
2018 deaths
Convergence and Union politicians
Economy ministers of Catalonia
Finance ministers of Catalonia
Members of the constituent Congress of Deputies (Spain)
Members of the 1st Congress of Deputies (Spain)
Members of the 3rd Congress of Deputies (Spain)
People from Barcelona
Catalan prisoners and detainees
Members of the 5th Parliament of Catalonia
Deaths from cancer in Spain
Deaths from leukemia